Latifabad (also Romanized as Laṭīfābād; also known as Qal‘eh Now) is a village in Sarakhs Rural District, in the Central District of Sarakhs County, Razavi Khorasan Province, Iran. At the 2006 census, its population was 93, in 18 families.

References 

Populated places in Sarakhs County